Jay Ganapathy is a politician and incumbent Member of the Legislative Assembly of Tamil Nadu. He was elected to the Tamil Nadu legislative assembly as an Indian National Congress candidate in the 2001 and 2006 elections.

References 

Indian National Congress politicians from Tamil Nadu
Living people
Year of birth missing (living people)